Ugljan  is a Croatian island and the first in the Zadar Archipelago. It is located northwest of the island of Pašman and southeast of the islands of Rivanj and Sestrunj. Separated from the mainland by the Zadar Channel, it is connected with the island of Pašman by the Ždrelac Bridge spanning over the Ždrelac Strait.

Description
The island was first mentioned under its present name in 1325. The continuity of population dates back to the Neolithic. Densely populated during the Roman period, in particular its north-western parts, where ample ruins of ancient buildings have been found. The present settlements date back to the Middle Ages. It is also home to Califfi Castle. In 16th and 17th centuries the island saw multiple waves of refugees from Ravni Kotari, who settled the island fleeing from the Ottomans.

The limestone part of the island is covered predominantly with macchia, while the dolomite area is occupied by farmland. Larger coves are Muline in the northwest, Lamjana Vela and Lamjana Mala in the southeast. The eastern coast descends mildly to the sea, characterized by many indents.

Ugljan is one of the most densely populated Croatian islands. All settlements (Preko, Ugljan, Lukoran, Sutomišćica, Poljana, Kali, Ošljak and Kukljica) are situated along the coast of the cultivated eastern side of the island. Major crops include olives, figs and vines. Set high above Preko are the ruins of St. Michael Fort. Ugljan has a regional road connected by the bridge with the regional road running along the island of Pašman. Ferry port in Preko; ferry connections with Zadar.

Notable people
The family of Gabriel Boric, president of Chile, came from Ugljan.

See also
 Kornati

References

Bibliography

External links
Ugljan Tourist Board
 The Island of Ugljan
 Kukljica
 Preko (Croatian)

 
Islands of Croatia
Islands of the Adriatic Sea
Landforms of Zadar County